This is a list of people from Sussex, a historic county in southern England. The following are people who were either born, brought up or have lived for a significant period of time in Sussex, or for whom Sussex is a significant part of their identity. Only those meeting notability criteria are included. A few people appear in more than one section of the list.

Arts

Actors

 George K. Arthur (1899—1985)
 Alexandra Bastedo (1946—2014)
 Daniel Betts (born 1971)
 Gwendoline Christie (born 1978)
 Sophie Cookson (born 1990)
 Tara Fitzgerald (born 1967)
 Philip Friend (born 1915—1987)
 Judy Geeson (born 1948)
 Nigel Humphreys (born 1951)
 Katie Johnson (born 1878—1957)
 Jane Leeves (born 1961) ('Frasier')
 Lesley Manville (born 1956)
 Charlotte Mardyn (1789—1844)
 Anna Massey (1937—2011)
 Tamzin Merchant (born 1987)
 Cecil Parker (1897—1971)
 Amanda Redman (born 1957)
 Dakota Blue Richards (born 1994)
 David Ryall (1935—2014)
 Greta Scacchi (born 1960)
 Nicollette Sheridan (born 1963)
 Hugh Williams (1904—1969)

Architects

 Robert Knott Blessley (1833—1923), architect
 Charles Busby (1786-1834), architect
 Somers Clarke (1841-1926), architect
 Ernest Coxhead (1863—1933), Sussex-born American architect
 John Leopold Denman (1882-1975), architect
 George Devey (1820-1886), architect
 Frederick Charles Eden (1864-1944), architect
 Walter Godfrey (1881-1961), architect
 Piers Gough (born 1946), architect
 Nicholas Grimshaw (born 1939), architect
 Thomas Lainson (1825-1898), architect
 Harvey Lonsdale Elmes (1814-1847), architect
 Hugh May (1621-1684), architect
 John Rebecca (died 1847), architect
 Ian Ritchie (born 1947), architect
 Edward Sargent (1842-1914), Sussex-born American architect
 Henry Bingham Towner (1909—1997), architect
 Randall Wells (1877-1942), architect
 Amon Henry Wilds (1784 or 1790-1857), architect
 Amon Wilds (1762-1833), architect

Artists

 Helen Cordelia Angell (1847-1884), watercolour painter
 Aubrey Beardsley (1872-1898), illustrator
 Raymond Briggs (1934-2022), illustrator, cartoonist and graphic novelist
 Edward Burra (1905-1976), painter
 Russell Drysdale (1912-1981), Sussex-born Australian artist
 Clifford Ellis (1907-1985), printmaker, painter and designer
 Ralph Ellis (1885-1963), painter and designer of inn signs
 Eric Gill (1882-1940), sculptor, typeface designer and printmaker
 Gluck (1895—1978), painter
 Patricia Goldsmith (1929—2017), painter and printmaker
 Captain Thomas Honywood (1819-1888), photographer
 Jamie Hewlett (born 1968), comic creator, animator and designer
 Edward Johnston (1872-1944), Uruguayan-born craftsman and calligrapher
 Alison Lapper (born 1965), artist
 Raoul Millais (1901-1999), portrait painter and equestrian artist
 Lee Miller (1907—1977), American-born photographer
 Marianne North (1830-1890), botanical artist
 Paul Pagk (born 1962), painter
 Roland Penrose (1900—1984), artist and collector of modern art
 Eric Ravilious (1903—1942), painter, designer, book illustrator and wood-engraver
 George Smith (1713/14-1776), landscape painter
 Hilary Stratton (1906-1985), sculptor
 Paddy Summerfield (born 1929), artist
 Paul Tanqueray (1905-1991), photographer
 Alan Thornhill (1921-2020), sculptor
 Alfred Tidey (1808-1892), miniature-painter

Broadcasters

 Zoe Ball (born 1970), television and radio presenter
 Hermione Cockburn (born 1973), television and radio presenter
 Simon Fuller (born 1960), television producer
 Sarah Kennedy (born 1950), television and radio presenter
 Des Lynam (born 1942), television presenter
 Piers Morgan (born 1965), broadcaster and journalist
 Richard Osman (born 1970), television presenter
 Jon Snow (born 1947), television presenter and journalist
 Jamie Theakston (born 1970), television and radio presenter
 Dan Walker (born 1977), television presenter, journalist and newsreader
 Holly Willoughby (born 1981), television presenter

Comedians

 James Bachman (born 1972), comedian
 Jo Brand (born 1957), comedian
 Harry Enfield (born 1961), comedian
 Stephen Grant (born 1973), comedian
 Tony Hawks (born 1960), comedian
 Alex Horne (born 1978), comedian
 Zoe Lyons (born 1971), comedian
 Max Miller (1894-1963), comedian
 Simon Nye (born 1958), comic television writer
 Paul Putner (born 1966), comedian
 Romesh Ranganathan (born 1978), comedian

Dancers

 Francesca Hayward (born 1992), ballet dancer
 Nancy Osbaldeston (born 1989), ballet dancer

Fashion designers

 Stella McCartney (born 1971)
 Ted Tinling (1910—1990)

Filmmakers

 Adam Stephen Kelly (born 1990), film director, screenwriter and producer
 Adrian Brunel (1892-1958), film director and screenwriter
 Charles Bennett (1899-1995), film director and screenwriter
 Don Chaffey (1917-1990), film director, screenwriter and producer
 Matt Charman (born 1979), screenwriter and producer
 Jack Clayton (1921-1995), film director and producer
 Graham Cutts (1884-1958), film director
 Brian Eastman (born 1949), film producer
 Sean Ellis (born 1970), film director, screenwriter and producer
 Robert Fox (born 1952), film producer
 Charles Frend (1909-1977), film director
 Manning Haynes (1889-1957), film director
 Pete Walker (born 1939), film director, screenwriter and producer

Musicians

 Charlesia Alexis (1934—2012), Chagossian singer
 Anohni (born 1971), singer
 Brett Anderson (born 1967), singer (Suede, The Tears)
 Florence Aylward (1862-1950), composer
 Tony Banks (born 1950), keyboardist
 Natasha Bedingfield (born 1981), singer-songwriter
 Wilfred Brown (1921-1971), tenor
 Henry Burstow (1826-1916), folk singer and bellringer
 Clara Butt (1872-1936), contralto
 Nick Cave (born 1957), Australian-born singer, songwriter
 Celeste (born 1994), singer and songwriter
 Tom Chaplin (born 1979), singer-songwriter and musician (Keane)
 Shirley Collins (born 1935), folk singer
 Ms. Dynamite (born 1981), singer
 Keith Emerson (1944-2016), keyboardist, songwriter and composer
 Gary Farr (born 1944), folk/blues singer
 Ruth Gipps (1921-1999), composer
 Dominic Glynn (born 1960), electronic composer
 Harry Gregson-Williams (born 1961), composer
 Mike Hazlewood (1941-2001), singer, composer and songwriter
 Nigel Kennedy (born 1956), violinist and violist
 William Henry Kerridge (1881—1940), organist
 Pete Kirtley (born 1972), songwriter
 Vera Lynn (1917-2020), singer and songwriter
 Conor Maynard (born 1992), singer-songwriter
 James McCartney (born 1977), musician and songwriter
 Paul McCartney (born 1942), singer-songwriter, has lived near Rye since the late 1970s
 Isolde Menges (1893-1976), violinist
 Tom Odell (born 1990), singer-songwriter
 Ray Noble (1903-1978), bandleader
 Passenger (born 1984), singer-songwriter, musician
 Maisie Peters (born 2000), singer-songwriter
 Rag'n'Bone Man (born 1985), singer and songwriter
 Leslie Rands (1900-1972), opera singer
 Tim Rice-Oxley (born 1976), musician and singer (Keane)
 Leo Sayer (born 1948), singer-songwriter
 Robert Smith (born 1959), singer, songwriter, musician (The Cure)
 Spider Stacy (born 1958), musician, singer, songwriter (The Pogues)
 Suggs (born 1961), singer-songwriter, musician (Madness)
 Nick Van Eede (born 1958), musician, producer, songwriter
 Thomas Weelkes (1576-1623), composer and organist
 Bruce Welch (born 1941), guitarist
 Wreckless Eric (born 1954), singer-songwriter
 Nicholas Yonge (c.1560-1619), singer

Writers

 Conrad Aiken (1889-1973), American-born writer and poet
 Joan Aiken (1924-2004), novelist
 Jane Aiken Hodge (1917-2009), American-born writer
 John Agard (born 1949), Guyanese-born poet
 Vivien Alcock (1924—2003), writer of children's books
 Val Andrews (1926—2006), prolific writer on magic
 Attila the Stockbroker (born 1957), punk poet
 David Bangs, writer and conservationist
 Elizabeth Bartlett (1924-2008), poet
 Viola Bayley (1911-1997), children's author
 Aubrey Beardsley (1872-1898), author
 Archibald Stansfield Belaney (commonly known as Grey Owl) (1888-1938)
 Hilaire Belloc (1870-1953), poet and writer
 Marie Belloc Lowndes (1868-1947), novelist
 E.F. Benson (1867-1940), writer
 Clementina Black (1853-1922), writer
 William Blake (1757-1827), poet
 Wilfrid Scawen Blunt (1840-1922), poet and writer
 Andrew Boorde (c.1490-1549)
 Joyce Lankester Brisley (1896-1978), writer
 Arabella Buckley (1840-1929), writer
 Anthony Burgess (1917-1993), novelist, wrote A Clockwork Orange in Etchingham
 Anna Burns (born 1962), novelist
 Edward Carpenter (1844-1929), poet
 John Caryll (senior) (1625-1711), poet and dramatist
 William Collins (1721-1759), poet
 Eliza Cook (1818—1889), writer and Chartist
 Catherine Cookson (1906-1998), author (citation required)
 E.M. Delafield (1890-1943), author
 Alice Dudeney (1866-1945), author and short story writer
 Henry Dudeney (1857-1930), author
 Maureen Duffy (born 1933), poet, novelist, non-fiction author
 Anne Francis (1738-1800), author
 John Fletcher (1579-1625), playwright
 Ford Maddox Ford (1873-1939), novelist and poet
 John Galsworthy (1867-1933), novelist and playwright
 Neil Gaiman (born 1960), fantasy writer
 Leon Garfield (1921-1996), writer of children's fiction
 Angelica Garnett (1918—2012), writer and artist
 David Garnett (1892-1981), writer
 Rumer Godden (1907-1998), writer
 Leon Gordon (1891-1960), playwright
 Elly Griffiths (born 1963), crime novelist
 Patrick Hamilton (1904-1962), playwright and novelist
 David Hare (born 1947), playwright and screenwriter
 William Hay (1695-1755), writer
 William Hayley (1745-1820), writer
 Ralph Hammond Innes (1913-1998), novelist
 Edward James (1907-1984), poet
 Henry James (1843-1916), American author
 Peter James (born 1948), writer of crime fiction
 P.J. Kavanagh (1931-2015), poet
 Sheila Kaye-Smith (1887-1956), novelist
 Grace Kimmins (1870-1954)
 Rudyard Kipling (1865-1936), poet and novelist
 Damian Le Bas (born 1985), writer
 Theodora Elizabeth Lynch (1812-1885), poet and novelist
 Peter Marshall (born 1946), biographer, travel writer and poet
 Thomas May (1594/5-1650), poet and dramatist
 Thomas Medwin (1788-1869), writer and poet
 A. A. Milne (1882—1956), author, best known for his Winnie-the-Pooh books
 Kate Mosse (born 1961), novelist
 Grace Nichols (born 1950), Guyanese-born poet
 William Nicholson (born 1948), screenwriter, novelist and playwright
 Thomas Otway (1652-1685), dramatist
 Hilary Douglas Clark Pepler (1878-1951), writer and poet
 Roland Penrose (1900-1984), poet and artist
 Valentine Penrose (1898—1978), French-born surrealist poet and author
 Alex Preston (born 1979), author and journalist
 Bessie Rayner Parkes (1829-1925), writer
 Richard Realf (1832-1878), poet
 Thomas Sackville, 1st Earl of Dorset (1536—1608), poet and dramatist
 Malcolm Saville (1901-1982), author
 Percy Bysshe Shelley (1792-1822), Romantic poet
 Chris Simms (born 1969), author of crime novels
 George Smith (1713/14-1776), poet
 Noel Streatfeild (1895-1986), author
 Alfred, Lord Tennyson (1809-1892), poet
 Isabella Tree (born 1964), writer and conservationist
 Robert Tressell (1870-1911), novelist, The Ragged-Trousered Philanthropists
 Frank Tuohy (1925-1999), writer
 Charles Webb (1939—2020), American novelist, The Graduate
 H.G. Wells (1866-1946), writer
 Barbara Willard (1909-1994), novelist
 Angus Wilson (1913-1991), novelist and short-story writer
 Virginia Woolf (1882-1941), writer

Explorers

 Thomas Bannister (1799—1874), explorer of Western Australia
 Victor L. A. Campbell (1875-1956), Antarctic explorer
 Isabella Charlet-Straton (1838—1918), mountaineer, made first winter ascent of Mont Blanc
 Charles Cooke Hunt (1833—1868), explorer of interior of Western Australia
 Nicholas Crane (born 1954), explorer and television presenter
 Ernest Joyce (1875-1940), Antarctic explorer
 Cecil Pashley (1891—1961), aviation pioneer
 Tim Peake (born 1972), astronaut
 Piers Sellers (1955-2016), astronaut

Military personnel

 Sidney Godley (1889-1957), recipient of Victoria Cross
 G. F. Gorringe (1868-1945), field commander
 Roger P. Hill (1910-2001), Royal Navy commander
 Ernest Joyce (1875-1940), Royal Navy seaman and explorer
 Frederick Tees (1922-1982), RAF gunner (Operation Chastise)
 Arthur David Torlesse (1902-1995), Royal Navy officer
 Cicely Ethel Wilkinson (1882/83—1967), possibly the only woman to qualify as a pilot in Britain during the First World War

Monarchs and nobility

 Adeliza of Louvain (c.1103—1151), Queen of England 1121-1135
 Aelle of Sussex (fl.c.477—c.514), King of Sussex
 Aethelwalh of Sussex (fl.c.660—c.685), King of Sussex
 Camilla, Duchess of Cornwall (born 1947), Wife of Charles, Prince of Wales
 Eppillus (fl. c. 20BC—AD7), Iron Age king with capital at Chichester
 Tiberius Claudius Cogidubnus (fl. 1st century AD), king of Regni
 George IV (1762—1830), King of the United Kingdom and King of Hanover 1820-1830
 Godwin, Earl of Wessex (died 1053), Earl of Wessex and father of Harold Godwinson, the last Anglo-Saxon king of England
 Meghan, Duchess of Sussex (born 1981), Duchess of Sussex
 Prince Harry, Duke of Sussex (born 1984), Duke of Sussex
 Verica (fl. c. AD15—AD42), king of southern Atrebates with capital at Chichester

Philanthropists

 Octav Botnar (1913—1998)
 Richard Churcher (1659—1723)
 Mad Jack Fuller (1757—1834)
 Ann Thwaytes (1789—1866)
 Jane Woodward (1823/4—1894)

Politicians and activists

 Edith Ayrton (1879-1945), suffragist
 Barbara Bodichon (1827–1891), feminist and women's rights activist
 Clementina Black (1853-1922), feminist and trade unionist
 James Callaghan (1912-2005), former Prime Minister of the United Kingdom 1976-1979
 Anna Campbell (1991-2018), feminist, anarchist and prison abolition activist who fought with the Women's Protection Units (YPJ) in the Rojava Conflict of the Syrian Civil War
 Edward Carpenter (1844-1929), early activist for gay rights and animal rights
 William Cawley (1602-1667), regicide and MP
 Jane Cobden (1851-1947), suffragist
 Richard Cobden (1804-1865), MP and co-founder of Anti-Corn Law League
 Maureen Colquhoun (1928—2021), UK's first openly lesbian MP
 Margery Corbett Ashby (1882-1981), suffragist, feminist and internationalist
 Cicely Corbett Fisher (1885-1959), suffragist and workers' rights activist
 Freeman Freeman-Thomas, 1st Marquess of Willingdon (1866-1941), politician, former Governor General of Canada and former Viceroy and Governor-General of India
 Harry Hay (1912-2002), Sussex-born American gay rights activist
 James Henty (1800-1882), Sussex-born Australian politician
 Douglas Hogg, 1st Viscount Hailsham, lawyer, politician and Lord Chancellor
 Sabrina Jean (born 1973), Chagossian activist
 Sophia Jex-Blake (1840-1912), suffragist
 Jenny Jones, Baroness Jones of Moulsecoomb (born 1949), first Green Party member of the House of Lords
 Helen Joseph (1905-1992), anti-apartheid activist
 Jomo Kenyatta (c.1897-1978), first prime minister and president of Kenya
 Imran Khan (born 1952), current Prime Minister of Pakistan
 Charles Lennox, 3rd Duke of Richmond (1735—1806), known as the 'radical duke', probable owner of 'Sussex declaration' of US independence
 Caroline Lucas (born 1960), first and only Green Party MP
 Harold Macmillan (1894-1986), Prime Minister of the United Kingdom 1957-1963
 Louisa Martindale (1839-1914), suffragist and workers' rights activist
 Theresa May (born 1956), former Prime Minister of the United Kingdom 2016-2019
 John Merfold (fl 1450-51), leader of 1450 uprising Henry VI
 William Merfold (fl 1450-51), leader of 1450 uprising against Henry VI
 Ralph Neville (died 1244), Lord Chancellor of England
 Thomas Paine (1737-1809), political activist
 Henry Pelham (1694-1754), Prime Minister of the United Kingdom 1743-1754
 Tony Penikett (born 1945), Premier of Yukon 1985—1992
 William Penn (1644—1718), founder of the Province of Pennsylvania, lived at Warminghurst
 Bessie Rayner Parkes (1829-1925), feminist
 Anita Roddick (1942-2007), human rights activist and environmental campaigner
 Anthony Stapley (1590-1655), regicide and MP
 William Bridgland Steer (1867-1939), trade unionist and politician
 Allen Vincatassin, first and current President of the Diego Garcia and Chagos Islands Council

Religious figures

Archbishops

 Thomas Arundel (1353-1414), Archbishop of Canterbury, 1397-1399 and Archbishop of York
 Thomas Bradwardine (1300-1349), Archbishop of Canterbury, 1349
 Accepted Frewen (1588-1664), Archbishop of York
 William Juxon (1582-1663), Archbishop of Canterbury 1660-1663
 Henry Edward Manning (1808—1892), Archbishop of Westminster (1865—1892) and cardinal of the Roman Catholic Church
 Cormac Murphy-O'Connor (1932—2017), Archbishop of Westminster and cardinal of the Roman Catholic Church (2000—2009)
 John Peckham (c.1230-1292), Archbishop of Canterbury 1279-1292

Martyrs

 George Gervase (1571-1608), martyred Catholic priest
 James Hannington (1847-1885), Anglican missionary and martyr
 Thomas Pilchard (11557-1587), Catholic priest and martyr
 Edward Shelley (c.1530-1588), Catholic martyr
 Richard Shelley (died 1586), Catholic recusant
 Richard Woodman (c.1524-1557), Protestant martyr

Saints

 Cuthmann of Steyning (c.681–8th century), saint
 Leofwynn of Bishopstone (fl 7th century), saint
 Richard of Chichester (1197–1253), patron saint of Sussex
 Philip Howard, 13th Earl of Arundel (1557-1595), Catholic saint

Other religious leaders

 Matthew Caffyn (1628-1714), General Baptist preacher
 Richard Challoner (1691-1781), Roman Catholic bishop and leading figure of English Catholicism
 Cornelia Connelly (1809—1879), US-born founder of the Society of the Holy Child Jesus and Mayfield School, Mayfield
 Richard Enraght (1837—1898), Irish-born Anglo-Catholic priest
 John Sirgood (1822—1885), Gloucestershire-born fundamentalist lay preacher, founder of Society of Dependants
 Thomas Stapleton (1535—1598), Catholic theologian
 Fiona Windsor (born 1956),  archdeacon of Horsham, and the first female archdeacon in Sussex

Scientists and scholars

Anthropologists

 E.E. Evans-Pritchard (1902-1973), anthropologist
 David Pilbeam (born 1940), palaeoanthropologist

Archaeologists

 John Pull (1899—1960)
 Mark Roberts (archaeologist) (born 1961)

Astronomers

 Patrick Moore (1923-2012), astronomer and broadcaster
 Ian Morison (born 1943), astronomer and astrophysicist
 Martin Ryle (1918-1984), radio astronomer, winner of Nobel Prize

Biologists

 William Borrer (1781—1862), botanist
 Edward Boyse (1923-2007), physician and biologist
 Barry Fell (1917—1994), zoologist
 Isabella Forshall (1900—1989), paediatric surgeon
 John Braxton Hicks (1823-1897), doctor and obstrecian
 Frederick Gowland Hopkins (1861-1947), biochemist and Nobel Prize winner
 Thomas Henry Huxley (1825—1895), biologist and anthropologist
 Sophia Jex-Blake (1840-1912), physician, pioneer female doctor
 Thomas H. Jukes (1906—1999), biologist known for his work in nutrition and molecular evolution
 Martin Holdgate (born 1931), biologist and environmental scientist
 Marianne North (1830-1890), biologist
 Richard Russell (1687-1759), physician
 Edith Rebecca Saunders (1865-1945), geneticist and plant anatomist
 F. M. L. Sheffield (1904—1973), botanist
 David Sims (born 1969), marine biologist
 Octavia Wilberforce (1888-1963), physician

Chemists

 Tom Blundell (born 1942), biochemist
 Martin Fleischmann (1927—2012), electrochemist
 Frederick Gowland Hopkins (1861-1947), biochemist and Nobel Prize winner
 Frederick Soddy (1877-1956), radiochemist

Computer scientists

 Stanley Gill (1926—1975), co-inventor of first computer subroutine
 Alan Turing (1912—1954)

Economists

 Richard Blundell (born 1952), economist and econometrician
 Richard Jolly (born 1934), development economist
 John Maynard Keynes (1883-1946), founder of Keynesian economics
 George Paish (1867-1957), economist

Geologists and palaeontologists

 Gideon Mantell (1790—1852), geologist, palaeontologist and obstetrician (discoverer of Iguanadon)

Historians

 Kevin Brownlow (born 1938), film historian
 Thomas Walker Horsfield (1792—1837), Yorkshire-born historian best known for his works on Sussex history
 Mark Antony Lower (1813–1876), known for his works on Sussex history, anti-Catholic propagandist and founder member of the Sussex Archaeological Society
 Elizabeth Norton (born 1986)
 Philip Payton (born 1953)
 Louis Francis Salzman (1878—1971), economic historian

Mathematicians

 Frank Anscombe (1918—2001), statistician
 Ruth Lawrence (born 1971)
 David Mumford (born 1937)
 John Pell (1611—1685)
 Harold Stanley Ruse (1905—1974)

Philosophers

 Thomas Bradwardine (1300—1349)
 Peter Kropotkin (1842—1921), anarcho-communist philosopher lived in Brighton
 Gilbert Ryle (1900—1976)

Physicists

 Emma Bunce (born 1975), space physicist
 Anthony French (1920—2017), physicist
 Alan Ernest Owen (1928—1999), physicist specialising in glass technology
 William Francis Gray Swann (1884—1962), physicist noted for his research into cosmic rays

Psychologists

 William Brown (1881—1952)
 Edward B. Titchener (1867-1927)

Sportspeople

Boxers

 Chris Eubank Jr. (born 1989)
 Alan Minter (1951-2020)
 Tom Sayers (1826-1865)
 Scott Welch (born 1968), known as 'the Brighton Rock'

Cricketers

 Chris Adams (born 1970), captain of the Sussex men's team during their 'golden era' in the early 2000s
 Georgia Adams (born 1993)
 Caroline Atkins (born 1981)
 Jem Broadbridge (1795—1843)
 Henry Charlwood (1846—1888)
 Holly Colvin (born 1989)
 Clare Connor (born 1976)
 George Cox Sr (1873—1949)
 Mason Crane (born 1997)
 Jemmy Dean (1816—1881)
 Duleepsinhji (1905—1959)
 Ed Giddins (born 1971)
 William Henty (1808—1881), bowled the first ever ball in a first class cricket match in Australia
 Jack Hobbs (1882—1963)
 Chris Jordan (born 1988)
 Imran Khan (born 1952)
 James Kirtley (born 1975)
 James Langridge (1906—1966)
 James Lillywhite (1842—1929)
 John Lillywhite (1826—1874)
 William Lillywhite (1792—1854)
 Kate Oakenfold (born 1984)
 Alan Oakman (1930—2018)
 Jim Parks (born 1903) (1903—1980)
 Jim Parks (born 1931) (born 1931)
 Barbara Pont (born 1933)
 Matt Prior (born 1982), South African-born cricketer for Sussex and England
 Ranjitsinhji (1872—1933)
 Albert Relf (1874—1937)
 Charlie Russell (born 1988)
 James Southerton (1827—1880)
 Maurice Tate (1895—1956)
 Joe Vine (1875—1946)
 Alexia Walker (born 1982)
 Alan Wells (born 1961)
 Colin Wells (born 1960)
 John Wisden (1826—1884)
 Elaine Wulcko (born 1959)

Footballers

 Gareth Barry (born 1981)
 Tony Bloom (born 1970), chairman and owner of Brighton & Hove Albion and Royale Union Saint-Gilloise
 Lewis Dunk (born 1991)
 Jarvis Kenrick (1852-1949)
 Bobby Tambling (born 1941)
 Charles Wollaston (1849-1926)

Golfers

 Max Faulkner (1916-2005)
 Abe Mitchell (1887-1947)
 Mark Seymour (1897-1952)

Racing drivers

 Derek Bell (born 1941)
 Martin Dugard (born 1969)
 Selwyn Edge (1868—1940)
 David Nye (born 1958)
 Jolyon Palmer (born 1991)
 Will Palmer (born 1997)
 David Purley (1945—1985)
 Richard Seaman (1913—1939)
 Jimmy Broadbent (born 1991)

Other sportspeople

 Chemmy Alcott (born 1982), ski racer
 Bob Champion (born 1948), jump jockey and Grand National winner
 Mark Davis (born 1972), snooker player
 Mercedes Gleitze (1900-1981), swimmer (first person to swim the Strait of Gibraltar, first British woman to swim the English Channel)
 Leslie Godfree (1885-1971), tennis player and winner of men's doubles at Wimbledon
 Will Green (born 1973), rugby union player
 Guy Harwood (born 1939), racehorse trainer
 David Howell (born 1990), youngest UK chess grandmaster
 Johanna Konta (born 1991), tennis player
 Richard Leman (born 1959), field hockey player
 Michael Olowokandi (born 1975), former NBA player
 Liam Treadwell (1986-2000), jockey

Other notables

 Beachy Head Lady (fl. early to mid 3rd century AD), thought to be the first known person of sub-Saharan origin in Britain. 
 Charles Burrell (born 1962), conservationist (Knepp Wildland Project)
 John Cripps (born 1927), orchardist, responsible for creation of the Pink Lady ('Cripps Pink') and Sundowner ('Cripps Red') apples
 Martin Coles Harman (1885—1954), self-proclaimed king of Lundy
 Cecil Hurst (1870—1963), international lawyer, President of the Permanent Court of International Justice in The Hague (1934—1936) and Chairman of the United Nations War Crimes Commission (1943—1945)
 Peter Love (died 1610), pirate
 John Selden (1584-1654), jurist
 Maria Ann Smith (1799-1870), orchardist, responsible for creation of the Granny Smith apple

See also
List of people from Brighton and Hove
List of people from Hastings
List of people from Lewes, East Sussex
List of people from Littlehampton
List of people from Worthing
List of Sussex County Cricket Club players
List of people from Cornwall
List of people from Yorkshire

Bibliography

References

Sussex